Antonio Navarro may refer to:

 Antonio García (racing driver) (Antonio Garcia Navarro, born 1980), Spanish professional racing driver
  (born 1936), Spanish Member of the European Parliament from 1986
 Antonio Navarro Wolff (born 1948), Colombian former guerrilla become politician
 José Antonio Navarro (17951871), Texas statesman, revolutionary, rancher, and merchant
 Luis Antonio García Navarro (born 1941), Spanish orchestral conductor